Thujene (or α-thujene) is a natural organic compound classified as a monoterpene.  It is found in the essential oils of a variety of plants, and contributes pungency to the flavor of some herbs such as Summer savory.

The term thujene usually refers to α-thujene.  A less common chemically related double-bond isomer is known as β-thujene (or 2-thujene).  Another double-bond isomer is known as sabinene.

See also
 Thujone
 Umbellulone, a thujene derivative

References

Monoterpenes
Cyclopentenes
Bicyclic compounds
Cyclopropanes
Isopropyl compounds